Węgierka  (Uhorka) is a village in the administrative district of Gmina Roźwienica, within Jarosław County, Subcarpathian Voivodeship, in south-eastern Poland.

The village has a population of 940.

References

Villages in Jarosław County